South Granville may refer to:
 South Granville, New South Wales
 South Granville, New York, a hamlet within Granville, New York
 South Granville Rise, Vancouver

See also
 Granville (disambiguation)